The 1990 All-Ireland Junior Hurling Championship was the 69th staging of the All-Ireland Junior Championship since its establishment by the Gaelic Athletic Association in 1912.

Tipperary entered the championship as the defending champions.

The All-Ireland final was played on 3 August 1990 at O'Moore Park in Portlaoise, between Kilkenny and Tipperary, in what was their first meeting in a final since 1988. Kilkenny won the match by 4-21 to 2-11 to claim their eighth championship title overall and a first title since 1988.

Results

All-Ireland Junior Hurling Championship

All-Ireland semi-final

All-Ireland final

References

Junior
All-Ireland Junior Hurling Championship